Isla Flecha, or the Arrow,  aka Isla El Borrego, is an island in the Gulf of California, located within Bahía de los Angeles east of the Baja California Peninsula. The island is uninhabited and is part of the Ensenada Municipality.

Biology

Isla Flecha has two species of reptile, Sauromalus hispidus (Spiny Chuckwalla) and Uta stansburiana (Common Side-blotched Lizard).

References

Islands of Baja California
Islands of Ensenada Municipality
Uninhabited islands of Mexico